Mario Farnbacher (born 14 May 1992) is a German racecar driver who currently competes in the WeatherTech SportsCar Championship.

Career

In 2019, Farnbacher won the WeatherTech SportsCar Championship GTD class championship with co-driver Trent Hindman. The following season, Farnbacher scored his second consecutive GTD class championship, this time with co-driver Matt McMurry.

With MSR's move to the DPi class for 2021, Farnbacher found himself initially without a ride. In January, however, it was announced that he would compete with Magnus Racing in their new Acura NSX GT3 at the 24 Hours of Daytona. For the remainder of the WeatherTech Sprint Cup, beginning at Mid-Ohio, he joined Compass Racing, driving alongside Jeff Kingsley. Following an injury suffered by Marc Miller prior to the round at VIR, Farnbacher also competed with Gradient Racing, finishing 15th in the GTD class following an accident.

For the 2022 IMSA SportsCar Championship season, Farnbacher embarked upon a Michelin Endurance Cup-only campaign with Gradient Racing, alongside a full-season effort in the GT World Challenge America with HPD Academy graduate Ashton Harrison.

Farnbacher began 2023 by taking part in the Michelin Pilot Challenge event at Daytona, driving for HART. It was his first time piloting a TCR touring car.

Racing record

Complete American Le Mans Series results
(key) (Races in bold indicate pole position)

Complete Grand-Am Rolex Sports Car Series results
(key) (Races in bold indicate pole position)

Complete WeatherTech SportsCar Championship results
(key) (Races in bold indicate pole position)

Complete Bathurst 12 Hours results

References

External links
Mario Farnbacher at Motorsport.com

1992 births
Living people
German racing drivers
24 Hours of Daytona drivers
WeatherTech SportsCar Championship drivers
American Le Mans Series drivers
GT World Challenge America drivers
People from Ansbach
Sportspeople from Middle Franconia
Racing drivers from Bavaria
Ma-con Motorsport drivers
Meyer Shank Racing drivers
ADAC Formel Masters drivers
Motopark Academy drivers
Nürburgring 24 Hours drivers
Michelin Pilot Challenge drivers